Akeem Haynes (born 11 March 1992) is a Canadian sprinter. Born in Jamaica, he moved together with his family to Yellowknife, Northwest Territories at age 7 before his family moved to Calgary when he was 10. Haynes qualified as a member of Canada's 4 × 100 m relay at the 2012 Summer Olympics in London.

He competed as part of Canada's Olympic team in Rio de Janeiro. In the 100 metre he ran a 10.24 in the heats and did not advance. Haynes was part of the 4 x 100 m relay team, which finished third in their heats to advance. In the final the team came agonizingly close to a medal; they were 0.02 seconds behind the third place United States team. However, the USA team was later disqualified for an improper baton pass, handing the bronze to Canada and Haynes who ran together with Andre De Grasse, Brendon Rodney, Aaron Brown, and Mobolade Ajomale who only ran in the heats.

On January 2, 2018, Haynes signed with the Hamilton Tiger-Cats of the Canadian Football League. He was released by the Tiger-Cats on May 10, 2018 before the start of preseason games.

Awards 

In August 2017, Haynes received the Athletes in Excellence Award from The Foundation for Global Sports Development in recognition of his community service efforts and work with youth.

References

External links
 
 
 https://www.tsn.ca/ticats-sign-canadian-sprinter-haynes-1.957458

1992 births
Living people
Athletes from Calgary
Athletes (track and field) at the 2012 Summer Olympics
Athletes (track and field) at the 2016 Summer Olympics
Black Canadian track and field athletes
Canadian male sprinters
Jamaican emigrants to Canada
Medalists at the 2016 Summer Olympics
Olympic bronze medalists for Canada
Olympic bronze medalists in athletics (track and field)
Olympic track and field athletes of Canada
People from Westmoreland Parish